The PlayStation technical specifications describe the various components of the original PlayStation video game console.

Central processing unit (CPU)
LSI CoreWare CW33300-based core
 MIPS R3000A-compatible 32-bit RISC CPU MIPS R3051 with 5 KB L1 cache, running at 33.8688 MHz.
 The microprocessor was manufactured by LSI Logic Corp. with technology licensed from SGI.
 Features:
 Initial feature size (process node) was 0.5 micron (500 nm).
 850k – 1M transistors
 Operating performance: 30 MIPS
 Bus bandwidth 132 MB/s
 One arithmetic/logic unit (ALU)
 One shifter
 CPU cache RAM:
 4 KB instruction cache
 1 KB non-associative SRAM data cache

Geometry Transformation Engine (GTE)
 Coprocessor that resides inside the main CPU processor, giving it additional vector math instructions used for 3D graphics, lighting, geometry, polygon and coordinate transformations GTE performs high-speed matrix multiplications.
 Operating performance: 66 MIPS
 Polygons per second (rendered in hardware):
 90,000 with texture mapping, lighting and Gouraud shading
 180,000 with texture mapping
 360,000 with flat shading

Motion Decoder (MDEC)
 Also residing within the main CPU, enables full screen, high quality FMV playback and is responsible for decompressing images and video into VRAM.
 Operating performance: 80 MIPS
 Documented device mode is to read three RLE-encoded 16×16 macroblocks, run IDCT and assemble a single 16×16 RGB macroblock.
 Output data may be transferred directly to GPU via DMA.
 It is possible to overwrite IDCT matrix and some additional parameters, however MDEC internal instruction set was never documented.
 It is directly connected to a CPU bus.

System Control Coprocessor (Cop0)
 This unit is part of the CPU. Has 16 32-bit control registers.
 Modified from the original R3000A cop0 architecture, with the addition of a few registers and functions. 
 Controls memory management through virtual memory technique, system interrupts, exception handling, and breakpoints.

Memory
 2 MB main EDO DRAM
 Additional RAM is integrated with the GPU (including a 1 MB framebuffer) and SPU (512 KB), see below for details.
 Cache RAM for CPU core and CD-ROM. See the relevant sections for details.
 Flash RAM support through the use of memory cards, see below.
 BIOS stored on 512 KB ROM

Graphics processing unit (GPU)
32-bit Sony GPU (designed by Toshiba)
 Handles display of graphics, control of framebuffer, and drawing of polygons and textures
 Handles 2D graphics processing, in a similar manner to the 3D engine
 RAM:
 1 MB VRAM (later models contained SGRAM) for framebuffer
 2 KB texture cache (132MB/s memory bus bandwidth, 32-bit wide)
 64 bytes FIFO buffer
 Features:
 Adjustable framebuffer (1024×512)
 Emulation of simultaneous backgrounds (to simulate parallax scrolling)
 Mask bit
 Texture window
 Dithering
 Clipping
 Alpha blending (4 per-texel alpha blending modes)
 Fog
 Framebuffer effects
 Transparency effects
 Render to texture
 Offscreen rendering
 Multipass rendering
 Flat or Gouraud shading and texture mapping
 No line restriction
 Colored light sourcing
 Resolutions:
 Progressive: 256×224 to 640×240 pixels
 Interlaced: 256×448 to 640×480 pixels
 Colors:
 Maximum color depth of 16,777,216 colors (24-bit true color)
 57,344 (256×224) to 153,600 (640×240) colors on screen
 Unlimited color lookup tables (CLUTs)
 32 levels of transparency
 All calculations are performed to 24 bit accuracy
 Texture mapping color mode:
 Mode 4: 4-bit CLUT (16 colors)
 Mode 8: 8-bit CLUT (256 colors)
 Mode 15: 15-bit direct (32,768 colors)
 Mode 24: 24-bit (16,777,216 colors)
 Sprite engine
 1024×512 framebuffer, 8×8 and 16×16 sprite sizes, bitmap objects
 Up to 4,000 sprites on screen (at 8×8 sprite size), scaling and rotation
 256×256 maximum sprite size
 Special sprite effects:
 Rotation
 Scaling up/down
 Warping
 Transparency
 Fading
 Priority
 Vertical and horizontal line scroll

Sound processing unit (SPU)
16-bit Sony SPU
 Supports ADPCM sources with up to 24 channels
 Sampling rate of up to 44.1 kHz
 512 KB RAM
 PCM audio source
 Supports MIDI sequencing
 Digital effects include:
 Pitch modulation
 Envelope
 Looping
 Digital reverb

I/O system and connectivity
CD-ROM drive
 660MB maximum storage capacity, double speed CD-ROM drive
 2×, with a maximum data throughput of 300 KB/s (double speed), 150KB/s (normal)
 128 KB data buffer
 XA Mode 2 compliant
 Audio CD play
 CD-DA (CD-Digital Audio)
 Rated for 70,000 seek operations
Two control pads via connectors
 Expandable with multitap connector
Backup flash RAM support
 Two removable cards
 Each card has 128 KB flash memory
 OS support for File Save, Retrieve and Remove
Video and audio connectivity
 AV Multi Out (Composite video, S-Video, RGBS)
 RCA Composite video and Stereo out (SCPH-100x to 5000 only)
 RFU (SCPH-112X) DC out (SCPH-100x to 5000 only)
 S-Video out (SCPH-1000 only)
Serial and parallel ports
 Serial I/O (used for PlayStation Link Cable SCPH-100x to 900x only)
 Parallel I/O (N/A) SCPH-100x to 750x only)
Power input
 100 V AC (NTSC-J); 120 V AC (NTSC-U/C); or 220–240 V AC (PAL)
 7.5 V DC 2 A (PSone only)

See also
 PlayStation 2 technical specifications
 PlayStation 3 technical specifications
 PlayStation 4 technical specifications

References

Technical specifications
Video game hardware
de:PlayStation#Hardware